Denholm Mitchell Elliott  (31 May 1922 – 6 October 1992) was an English actor. 
Elliott trained at the Royal Academy of Dramatic Art before appearing in numerous productions on stage and screen. Film critic Roger Ebert described him as "the most dependable of all British character actors." The New York Times called him "a star among supporting players" and "an accomplished scene-stealer". He was appointed a Commander of the Order of the British Empire (CBE) by Queen Elizabeth II in 1988.

He received three BAFTA Award for Best Actor in a Supporting Role for his roles in Trading Places (1983), A Private Function (1984) and Defence of the Realm (1985). He received an Academy Award for Best Supporting Actor nomination for A Room with a View (1985). He's also known for his performances in Alfie (1966), A Doll's House (1973), A Bridge Too Far (1977), Maurice (1987), September (1987), and Noises Off (1992). He portrayed Marcus Brody in the Steven Spielberg films Raiders of the Lost Ark (1981) and Indiana Jones and the Last Crusade (1989).

Early life
Elliott was born May 31, 1922, in Kensington, London, the son of Nina (née Mitchell; 1893–1966) and Myles Layman Farr Elliott, MBE (1890–1933), a barrister who had read law and Arabic at Cambridge before fighting with the Gloucestershire Regiment at Gallipoli and in Mesopotamia. In 1930, Myles Elliott was appointed solicitor-general to the Mandatory Government in Palestine. Three years later, following a series of controversial government prosecutions, he was assassinated outside the King David Hotel and buried in the Protestant Cemetery on Mount Zion.
Elliott's elder brother Neil Emerson Elliott (1920–2003) was a land agent to Lady Anne Cavendish-Bentinck.

Elliott attended Malvern College and trained at the Royal Academy of Dramatic Art (RADA) in London. He was asked to leave the Academy after one term. As Elliott later recalled, "They wrote to my mother and said, 'Much as we like the little fellow, he's wasting your money and our time. Take him away!'"

In the Second World War, he joined the Royal Air Force, training as a wireless operator/air gunner and serving with No. 76 Squadron RAF under the command of Leonard Cheshire. On the night of 23/24 September 1942, his Handley Page Halifax DT508 bomber took part in an air raid on the U-boat pens at Flensburg, Germany. The aircraft was hit by flak and subsequently ditched in the North Sea near Sylt, Germany. Elliott and four of his crewmen survived, and he spent the rest of the war in Stalag Luft VIIIb, a prisoner-of-war camp in Lamsdorf (now Łambinowice), Silesia. While imprisoned, he became involved in amateur dramatics. He formed a theatre group that was so successful it toured other POW camps playing Twelfth Night.

Career
After making his film debut in Dear Mr. Prohack (1949) he went on to play a wide range of parts, including an officer in The Cruel Sea and often ineffectual and occasionally seedy characters, such as the drunken journalist Bayliss in Defence of the Realm, the criminal abortionist in Alfie, and the washed-up film director in The Apprenticeship of Duddy Kravitz.  Elliott and Natasha Parry played the main roles in the 1955 television play The Apollo of Bellac. He took over for an ill Michael Aldridge for one season of The Man in Room 17 (1966)

Elliott made many television appearances, which included plays by Dennis Potter such as Follow the Yellow Brick Road (1972), Brimstone and Treacle, (1976) and Blade on the Feather (1980). He starred in the BBC's adaptation of Charles Dickens's short story The Signalman (1976).  He also co- starred in the made-for-T.V. film The Strange Case of Dr. Jekyll and Mr. Hyde, starring Jack Palance, produced by Dan Curtis, music composed and conducted by Robert Cobert (Curtis and Cobert were also, at that time, working on the famed Gothic horror soap opera Dark Shadows [1966 - 1971.])

In the 1980s he won three consecutive British Academy of Film and Television Arts (BAFTA) Awards: Best Supporting Actor for Trading Places as Dan Aykroyd's kindly butler, A Private Function, and Defence of the Realm. He received an Academy Award nomination for A Room with a View. He became familiar to a wider audience as the well-meaning but confused Dr. Marcus Brody in Raiders of the Lost Ark (1981) and Indiana Jones and the Last Crusade. A photograph of his character appears in  Indiana Jones and the Kingdom of the Crystal Skull, and a reference is made to Brody's death. Also, a statue was dedicated to Marcus outside Marshall College, the school where Indy teaches. In 1988 Elliott was the Russian mole Povin, around whom the entire plot revolves, in the television miniseries Codename: Kyril.

Having filmed Michael Winner's The Wicked Lady (1983), Elliott was quoted in a BBC Radio interview as saying that Marc Sinden and he "are the only two British actors I am aware of who have ever worked with Winner more than once, and it certainly wasn't for love. But curiously, I never, ever saw any of the same crew twice." (Elliott in You Must Be Joking! (1965) and The Wicked Lady and Sinden in The Wicked Lady and Decadence). Elliott had worked with Sinden's father, Sir Donald Sinden, in the film The Cruel Sea (1953). He co-starred with Katharine Hepburn and Harold Gould in the television film Mrs. Delafield Wants to Marry (1986) and with Nicole Kidman in Bangkok Hilton (1989).

In 1988 Elliott was appointed a Commander of the Order of the British Empire (CBE) for his services to acting. His career included many stage performances, including with the Royal Shakespeare Company, and a well-acclaimed turn as the twin brothers in Jean Anouilh's Ring Round the Moon. His scene-stealing abilities led Gabriel Byrne, his co-star in Defence of the Realm, to say, "Never act with children, dogs, or Denholm Elliott."

Despite being described by the British Film Institute's Screenonline as an actor of "versatile understanding and immaculate technique," Elliott described himself as an instinctive actor and was a critic of Stanislavski's system of acting, saying, "I mistrust and am rather bored with actors who are of the Stanislavski school who think about detail."

Personal life
Secretly bisexual, Elliott was married twice: first to actress Virginia McKenna for a few months in 1954, and later in an open marriage to American actress Susan Robinson, with whom he had two children, Mark and Jennifer, the latter of whom died by suicide in 2003.

Death
Elliott was diagnosed with HIV in 1987 and died of AIDS-related tuberculosis at his home in Santa Eulària des Riu on Ibiza, Spain, on 6 October 1992 at the age of 70. Tributes were paid by actors Sir Donald Sinden and Sir Peter Ustinov, playwright Dennis Potter and former wife Virginia McKenna. Sinden said, "He was one of the finest screen actors and a very special actor at that. He was one of the last stars who was a real gentleman. It is a very sad loss." Ustinov said, "He was a wonderful actor and a very good friend on the occasions that life brought us together." Potter commented, "He was a complicated, sensitive, and slightly disturbing actor. Not only was he a very accomplished actor, he was a dry, witty, and slightly menacing individual. As a man, I always found him very open, very straightforward and very much to the point." McKenna added, "It is absolutely dreadful, but the person I am thinking of at the moment more than anybody is his wife. It must be terrible for her." Ismail Merchant described Elliott as "an all-giving person, full of life ... He had an affection and feeling for other actors, which is very unusual in our business."

His widow set up a charity, the Denholm Elliott Project, and collaborated on his biography. She worked closely with the UK Coalition of People Living with HIV and AIDS. Susan Robinson Elliott died on 12 April 2007, aged 65, in a fire in her flat in London.

Filmography

Film

Television

Awards and nominations

See also

List of British actors
List of people from Kensington
List of RADA alumni

Notes

References

External links
 
 
 
 Denholm Elliott BFI
 Performances in the Theatre Archive University of Bristol

1922 births
1992 deaths
20th-century deaths from tuberculosis
20th-century English male actors
20th-century English LGBT people
AIDS-related deaths in Spain
Alumni of RADA
Best Supporting Actor BAFTA Award winners
Best Actor BAFTA Award (television) winners
Bisexual male actors
English LGBT actors
British World War II prisoners of war
Commanders of the Order of the British Empire
Donaldson Award winners
English expatriates in Spain
English male film actors
English male Shakespearean actors
English male stage actors
English male television actors
English male voice actors
Male actors from London
Military personnel from Middlesex
People educated at Malvern College
People from Kensington
People from Ibiza
People with HIV/AIDS
Royal Air Force airmen
Royal Air Force personnel of World War II
Shot-down aviators
Tuberculosis deaths in Spain
World War II prisoners of war held by Germany